Events from the year 1544 in France.

Incumbents
 Monarch – Francis I

Events
11 April – Battle of Ceresole
2 to 4 June – Battle of Serravalle
July - August; siege of St. Dizier, during the Italian War of 1542–46

Births

Full date missing
Guillaume de Salluste Du Bartas, poet (died 1590).

Deaths

Full date missing
Clément Marot, poet (born 1496)
Charles du Dros, governor
Bonaventure des Périers, writer (born c.1510)
Pierre Chambiges, mason and architect
René of Châlon, Prince of Orange and stadtholder in the Low Countries

See also

References

1540s in France